Pamela J. Fayle  (born 21 October 1954 in Tamworth, New South Wales) was the Australian Ambassador to Germany from 2003 until 2006 with non-resident accreditation to Switzerland and Liechtenstein.  She also served as the ambassador to the Asia-Pacific Economic Cooperation from 2000 until 2002.

Fayle studied economics and Asian studies at the Australian National University.

References

1954 births
Living people
Ambassadors of Australia to Germany
Ambassadors of Australia to Switzerland
Ambassadors of Australia to Liechtenstein
Australian National University alumni
Australian women ambassadors
Ambassadors of Australia for Asia-Pacific Economic Cooperation
Members of the Order of Australia
People from Tamworth, New South Wales